Sara Navarro Rivera (born 21 August 1995) is a Spanish footballer who plays as a forward and midfielder for Eibar.

Club career
Navarro started her career at Espanyol.

References

External links
Profile at La Liga

1995 births
Living people
Women's association football forwards
Spanish women's footballers
Sportspeople from Sabadell
Footballers from Catalonia
RCD Espanyol Femenino players
Fundación Albacete players
Sporting de Huelva players
SD Eibar Femenino players
Primera División (women) players
Segunda Federación (women) players
Women's association football midfielders
Sportswomen from Catalonia
FC Levante Las Planas players
Primera Federación (women) players
Deportivo de La Coruña (women) players